In Greek mythology, Nireus (Ancient Greek: Νιρεύς) was a king of the island Syme (according to Diodorus Siculus, also of a part of Cnidia) and one of the Achaean leaders in the Trojan War.

Biography 
Nireus was the son of King Charopus and Aglaea. He was renowned for his outstanding beauty, being described as the second most handsome man in the Greek camp after Achilles.

Mythology 
Nireus was among the suitors of Helen and consequently joined in the campaign against Troy; he was said to have commanded three ships. In the military conflict with the Mysian king Telephus, which occurred on the way to Troy (during the first unsuccessful attempt to reach the city), Nireus killed Telephus' wife Hiera, who fought from a chariot "like an Amazon".

Another story of Nireus, who was "the most beautiful man who came beneath Ilion" (Iliad, 2.673), is the one of his love for Heracles. But Ptolemy adds that certain authors made Nireus out to be a son of Heracles.

Nireus did not excel in physical strength and was eventually killed by either Eurypylus, son of Telephus, or Aeneas. However, according to the version recounted by John Tzetzes, Nireus survived the war and, together with Thoas, having been caught in the storm that scattered the Greek ships, landed first in Libya and then sailed off to Argyrinoi and the Ceraunian Mountains, where they settled near Mount Lakmynion and River Aias.

Notes

References 

 Dares Phrygius, from The Trojan War. The Chronicles of Dictys of Crete and Dares the Phrygian translated by Richard McIlwaine Frazer, Jr. (1931-). Indiana University Press. 1966. Online version at theio.com
 Dictys Cretensis, from The Trojan War. The Chronicles of Dictys of Crete and Dares the Phrygian translated by Richard McIlwaine Frazer, Jr. (1931-). Indiana University Press. 1966. Online version at the Topos Text Project.
 Diodorus Siculus, The Library of History translated by Charles Henry Oldfather. Twelve volumes. Loeb Classical Library. Cambridge, Massachusetts: Harvard University Press; London: William Heinemann, Ltd. 1989. Vol. 3. Books 4.59–8. Online version at Bill Thayer's Web Site
 Diodorus Siculus, Bibliotheca Historica. Vol 1-2. Immanel Bekker. Ludwig Dindorf. Friedrich Vogel. in aedibus B. G. Teubneri. Leipzig. 1888–1890. Greek text available at the Perseus Digital Library.
 Euripides, The Plays of Euripides, translated by E. P. Coleridge. Volume II. London. George Bell and Sons. 1891. Online version at the Perseus Digital Library.
 Euripides, Euripidis Fabulae. vol. 3. Gilbert Murray. Oxford. Clarendon Press, Oxford. 1913. Greek text available at the Perseus Digital Library.
 Homer, The Iliad with an English Translation by A.T. Murray, Ph.D. in two volumes. Cambridge, MA., Harvard University Press; London, William Heinemann, Ltd. 1924. Online version at the Perseus Digital Library.
 Homer. Homeri Opera in five volumes. Oxford, Oxford University Press. 1920. Greek text available at the Perseus Digital Library.
 Hyginus, Fabulae from The Myths of Hyginus translated and edited by Mary Grant. University of Kansas Publications in Humanistic Studies. Online version at the Topos Text Project.
 John Tzetzes, Book of Histories, Book I translated by Ana Untila from the original Greek of T. Kiessling's edition of 1826.  Online version at theio.com
 Lucius Flavius Philostratus, Heroica, translation by Jennifer K. Berenson Maclean and Ellen Bradshaw Aitken, Flavius Philostratus: On Heroes, WGRW 3 (Atlanta: Society of Biblical Literature, 2002), XX. Harvard University's Center for Hellenic Studies. Online version at the Topos Text Project.
 Lucius Flavius Philostratus, Flavii Philostrati Opera. Vol 2. Carl Ludwig Kayser. in aedibus B. G. Teubneri. Lipsiae. 1871. Greek text available at the Perseus Digital Library.
 Pseudo-Apollodorus, The Library with an English Translation by Sir James George Frazer, F.B.A., F.R.S. in 2 Volumes, Cambridge, MA, Harvard University Press; London, William Heinemann Ltd. 1921. Online version at the Perseus Digital Library. Greek text available from the same website.
 Quintus Smyrnaeus, The Fall of Troy translated by Way. A. S. Loeb Classical Library Volume 19. London: William Heinemann, 1913. Online version at theio.com
 Quintus Smyrnaeus, The Fall of Troy. Arthur S. Way. London: William Heinemann; New York: G.P. Putnam's Sons. 1913. Greek text available at the Perseus Digital Library.

Male lovers of Heracles
Achaean Leaders